Count Mikhail Vasilyevich Kakhovski (1734–1800) was a senior Russian general who led the imperial army to a rapid victory in the Polish–Russian War of 1792. This victory precipitated the Second Partition of Poland and brought Kakhovsky the Order of St. Andrew.

Kakhovsky also took part in many other wars waged by Catherine the Great, including the first and second wars against Turks. After the First Partition of Poland he was put in charge of the Mogilev Governorate. Later in life he served as Governor General of Nizhny Novgorod and Penza.

1734 births
1800 deaths
Imperial Russian Army generals
Russian people of the Polish–Russian War of 1792
People of the Russo-Turkish War (1768–1774)